The Academy Award for Best Costume Design is one of the Academy Awards presented annually by the Academy of Motion Picture Arts and Sciences (AMPAS) for achievement in film costume design.

The award was first given in 1949, for films made in 1948. Initially, separate award categories were established for black-and-white films and color films. Since the merger of the two categories in 1967, the academy has traditionally avoided giving out the award to films with a contemporary setting.

Award

The Academy Award for Best Costume Design is given out annually by the Academy of Motion Picture Arts & Sciences for the best achievement of film costume design of the previous year. Films that are eligible for the award must meet a series of criteria, including the requirement that the costumes must have been "conceived" by a costume designer. For this particular criteria, each submission is reviewed by the costume designer members of the Art Directors Branch prior to the ballot process. Further rules include that the nominee(s) be only the principal costume designer(s), that the five films that receive the highest number of votes will become the ceremony's nominations for final voting, and that the final voting will only be undertaken by active and life members of the academy.

History
The Academy Award for Best Costume Design was first given out at the 21st Academy Awards, held on March 24, 1949. The award had two subcategories, one for films in black and white and one for films in color. At the 30th Academy Awards, held on March 26, 1958, these two subcategories were merged into one, which was the result of the academy reducing the number of competitive categories from 30 to 24. The 32nd Academy Awards saw the category again be split into two for recognition of both black and white and color film. Eight years later, the Academy Award for Best Costume Design, along with two other awards, were each combined into their own single category recognizing achievement in film.

From 1949 to 1966, most Academy Awards for Best Costume Design in Black and White were given to a contemporary movie. On the other hand, epics, fantasies, and musicals dominated the color category. Since the merger into one singular category for color films in 1967, films set in modern times have won only three times. The three contemporary-set winners have been Travels with My Aunt, All That Jazz, and The Adventures of Priscilla, Queen of the Desert. All other winners during this period have been set in the past or in a science-fiction or fantasy setting.

Winners and nominees

Most wins and nominations
Edith Head won eight times and was nominated 35 times in all, both the most in history. Milena Canonero and Colleen Atwood are the most honored living designers, with four awards each.

1940s

1950s

1960s

1970s

1980s

1990s

2000s

2010s

2020s

Notes

Multiple nominations
The following 85 designers have received multiple nominations for the Academy Award for Best Costume Design. This list is sorted by the number of total awards (with the number of total nominations listed in parentheses).

8: Edith Head (35)
5: Irene Sharaff (15)
4: Colleen Atwood (12)
4: Milena Canonero (9)
3: Charles LeMaire (16)
3: Sandy Powell (15)
3: Jenny Beavan (12)
3: Dorothy Jeakins (12)
3: Anthony Powell (6)
3: Orry-Kelly (4)
3: James Acheson (3)
2: Helen Rose (10)
2: Jacqueline Durran (8)
2: Albert Wolsky (7)
2: Gile Steele (6)
2: Danilo Donati (5)
2: Vittorio Nino Novarese (5)
2: Ann Roth (5)
2: Mark Bridges (4)
2: Ruth E. Carter (4)
2: Catherine Martin (4)
2: Phyllis Dalton (3)
2: Piero Gherardi (3)
2: Cecil Beaton (2)
2: Elizabeth Haffenden (2)
2: John Mollo (2)

1: Jean Louis (14)
1: Walter Plunkett (10)
1: Bill Thomas (10)
1: Mary Wills (7)
1: John Bright (6)
1: Alexandra Byrne (6)
1: Margaret Furse (6)
1: Renie Conley (5)
1: Marjorie Best (4)
1: William Travilla (4)
1: Theoni V. Aldredge (3)
1: Ngila Dickson (3)
1: Norma Koch (3)
1: Michael O'Connor (3)
1: Gabriella Pescucci (3)
1: Edward Stevenson (3)
1: Marik Vos (3)
1: Tony Walton (3)
1: Yvonne Blake (2)
1: Eiko Ishioka (2)
1: Elois Jenssen (2)
1: Barbara Karinska (2)
1: Theodor Pištěk (2)
1: Richard Taylor (2)

1: Arlington Valles (2)
0: Patricia Norris (6)
0: Piero Tosi (5)
0: Howard Shoup (5)
0: Donfeld (4)
0: Moss Mabry (4)
0: Janet Patterson (4)
0: Jacqueline West (4)
0: Mary Zophres (4)
0: Ray Aghayan (3)
0: Consolata Boyle (3)
0: Donald Brooks (3)
0: Morton Haack (3)
0: Bob Mackie (3)
0: Judianna Makovsky (3)
0: Arianne Phillips (3)
0: Anna B. Sheppard (3)
0: William Ware Theiss (3)
0: Theadora Van Runkle (3)
0: Miles White (3)
0: Paul Zastupnevich (3)
0: Sharen Davis (2)
0: Paco Delgado (2)
0: René Hubert (2)
0: John Jensen (2)

0: Ralph Jester (2)
0: Joanna Johnston (2)
0: Anna Hill Johnstone (2)
0: Irene Lentz (2)
0: Anthony Mendleson (2)
0: Herschel McCoy (2)
0: Maurizio Millenotti (2)
0: Judy Moorcroft (2)
0: Ruth Myers (2)
0: Mary Ann Nyberg (2)
0: Massimo Cantini Parrini (2)
0: Bob Ringwood (2)
0: Shirley Ann Russell (2)
0: Luis Sequeira (2)
0: Anthea Sylbert (2)
0: Joe I. Tompkins (2)
0: Julie Weiss (2)

See also
 BAFTA Award for Best Costume Design
 Critics' Choice Movie Award for Best Costume Design
 Saturn Award for Best Costume Design

References

External links
 Academy of Motion Picture Arts and Sciences official site

Costume Design
 
Awards for film costume design
Costume design